
Gmina Kańczuga is an urban-rural gmina (administrative district) in Przeworsk County, Subcarpathian Voivodeship, in south-eastern Poland.

Villages
Apart from the town of Kańczuga, Gmina Kańczuga contains the villages and settlements of Bóbrka Kańczucka, Chodakówka, Krzeczowice, Lipnik, Łopuszka Mała, Łopuszka Wielka, Medynia Kańczucka, Niżatyce, Pantalowice, Rączyna, Siedleczka, Sietesz, Wola Rzeplińska and Żuklin.

Neighbouring gminas
Gmina Kańczuga is bordered by the gminas of Dubiecko, Gać, Jawornik Polski, Markowa, Pruchnik, Przeworsk and Zarzecze.

References

Polish official population figures 2006

Kanczuga
Przeworsk County